Richard "Rick" Horatio Kavanian (born 26 January 1971) is a German actor, comedian, author and voice actor and dubber. He is famous for his cooperation with Michael Herbig, which led to many popular movie comedies and parodies, e.g. Manitou's Shoe.

Life 
Rick Kavanian grew up with his parents, both Armenian who emigrated from Bucharest to Munich in the 1950s, and his grandmother. As a child he learned to speak Romanian from his parents who used to live in Romania, Armenian from his grandmother and learned German and English in school.

From 1990 to 1994 Kavanian studied political science, North American history and psychology in Munich and Augsburg. The cooperation with Michael Herbig began in 1990, when both worked as authors and speakers for a German comedy radio show. In 1995 Kavanian moved to New York City and studied acting at the Lee Strasberg Theatre Institute. After his return to Germany he played several roles alongside Herbig in the TV comedy show Easy Bully, which later fades to the successful TV comedy show Bullyparade. Henceforward Rick starred in several comedy movies, had many TV appearances and began his work as a successful Stand-up comedian.

Kavanian lives in Munich together with his wife Ilka. His personal idol is the British actor Peter Sellers.

Filmography 
as movie actor

 2001: Manitou's Shoe
 2001: 
 2002: 
 2004: Traumschiff Surprise – Periode 1
 2006: Hui Buh – Das Schlossgespenst
 2007: Lissi und der wilde Kaiser
 2007: Keinohrhasen
 2008: 1½ Knights – In Search of the Ravishing Princess Herzelinde
 2009: Mord ist mein Geschäft, Liebling
 2010: Otto's Eleven
 2021: Beckenrand Sheriff

as voice actor

 1999: Austin Powers 2 (German voice of Austin Powers (Mike Myers))
 2000: Happy Texas (German voice of Steve Zahn)
 2000: South Park (German voice of Phillip (Trey Parker))
 2002: Austin Powers 3 (German voice of Austin Powers, Dr. Evil, Fat Bastard and Goldmember (Mike Myers))
 2004: Harold & Kumar (German voice of Kumar)
 2005: Madagascar (German voice of Marty (Chris Rock))
 2006: Cars (German voice of Luigi)
 2006: Happy Feet (German voice of Ramon)
 2006: Das hässliche Entlein & ich (German voice of Ratso)
 2007: Lissi und der wilde Kaiser (several voices)
 2007: Meet the Robinsons
 2008: Kleiner Dodo
 2008: The Love Guru (German voice of Mike Myers)
 2008: Madagascar 2 (German voice of Marty (Chris Rock))
 2010: Toy Story 3 (German voice of Rex)
 2011: Cars 2 (German voice of Luigi)
 2011: Happy Feet 2 (German voice of Ramon)
 2012: Hotel Transylvania (German voice of Dracula)
 2015: Hotel Transylvania 2 (German voice of Dracula)
2017: Cars 3 (German voice of Luigi)
 2018: Hotel Transylvania 3: Summer Vacation (German voice of Dracula)
 2018: Tabaluga
as actor and author on television

 1996: Easy Bully
 1997–2002: Bullyparade
 2004–2006: Bully & Rick
 2008–2009: Kosmopilot
 2011-: Die Klugscheisser

References

External links 
 
 Rick Kavanian - 'Du bjist eecht ljustig' TV Star Portrait
  
Rick Kavanian at the German Dubbing Card Index

1971 births
Living people
German male film actors
German male voice actors
German male television actors
German male comedians
German people of Armenian descent
Male actors from Munich